The 2020 Pennzoil 150, branded as the Pennzoil 150 at the Brickyard, was a NASCAR Xfinity Series race held on July 4, 2020 at the road course at Indianapolis Motor Speedway in Speedway, Indiana. Contested over 62 laps on the  road course, it was the 13th race of the 2020 NASCAR Xfinity Series season and the Xfinity Series' first ever race at IMS's 14-turn road course layout. Chase Briscoe picked up his third win in the last four races.

Report

Background 

The Indianapolis Motor Speedway, located in Speedway, Indiana, (an enclave suburb of Indianapolis) in the United States, is the home of the Indianapolis 500 and the Brickyard 400. It is located on the corner of 16th Street and Georgetown Road, approximately six miles (10 km) west of Downtown Indianapolis.

Constructed in 1909, it is the original speedway, the first racing facility so named. It has a permanent seating capacity estimated at 235,000 with infield seating raising capacity to an approximate 400,000. It is the highest-capacity sports venue in the world. 

Considered relatively flat by American standards, the track is a 2.5-mile (4.0 km), nearly rectangular oval with dimensions that have remained essentially unchanged since its inception: four 0.25-mile (0.40 km) turns, two 0.625-mile long (1.006 km) straightaways between the fourth and first turns and the second and third turns, and two .125-mile (0.201 km) short straightaways – termed "short chutes" – between the first and second, and third and fourth turns.

After Cup Series driver Matt DiBenedetto tested two configurations of the road course in January 2020, NASCAR decided to use the 14-turn, 2.439-mile configuration that is normally used for the GMR Grand Prix.

The race was held without fans in attendance due to the ongoing COVID-19 pandemic.

Entry list 

 (R) denotes rookie driver.
 (i) denotes driver who is ineligible for series driver points.

Practice

First practice 

Final practice 

Qualifying 
Jeb Burton was awarded the pole for the race as determined by a random draw.

Starting Lineup

Race

Race results

Stage Results 
Stage One

Laps: 20

Stage Two

Laps: 20

Final Stage Results 
Laps: 22

Race statistics 

 Lead changes: 12 among 8 different drivers
 Cautions/Laps: 5 for 15
 Red flags: 0
 Time of race: 2 hours, 2 minutes, 48 seconds
 Average speed:

Media

Television 
The Pennzoil 150 was carried by NBC in the United States. Rick Allen, Jeff Burton, Steve Letarte, and Dale Earnhardt Jr. called the race from Charlotte Motor Speedway. Marty Snider and Kelli Stavast covered pit road at the track, and Rutledge Wood handled the features from IMS. Additionally, Mike Tirico and Dale Jarrett provided updates and analysis from the pagoda at Indianapolis.

Radio 
The Indianapolis Motor Speedway Radio Network and the Performance Racing Network jointly co-produced the radio broadcast for the race, which was simulcast on SiriusXM NASCAR Radio and aired on IMS or PRN stations, depending on contractual obligations.

Standings after the race 

 Drivers' Championship standings

 Note: Only the first 12 positions are included for the driver standings.
 . – Driver has clinched a position in the NASCAR playoffs.

References 

2020 NASCAR Xfinity Series
2020 in sports in Indiana
July 2020 sports events in the United States
2020